The Men's giant slalom competition at the FIS Alpine World Ski Championships 2019 was held on 15 February 2019. A qualification was held on 14 February 2019.

Results

Final
The first run started at 14:15 and the second run at 17:45.

Qualification

References

Men's giant slalom